The Winston Churchill Range is a mountain range in the central section of the Park Ranges of the Canadian Rockies located in Jasper National Park. The range was named after Sir Winston Churchill, former British prime minister.

The eastern boundary of the range begins on the western side of Sunwapta River from the Jasper and Banff boundary and extends north to Sunwapta Falls. The western boundary of the range is defined by the Athabasca River valley to the east of Warwick Mountain. The valley narrows as it approaches the Continental Divide, and separates Mt. Columbia from Mt. King Edward, the latter of which is not part of the range.

This range includes the following mountains and peaks:

References

 
Ranges of the Canadian Rockies